Anisotoma humeralis is a species of round fungus beetle in the family Leiodidae. It is found in Europe and Northern Asia (excluding China) and North America.

References

Further reading

External links

 

Leiodidae
Articles created by Qbugbot
Beetles described in 1792